Khajamalai or Kajamalai is a suburb in the city of Tiruchirappalli, Tamil Nadu, India. Khajamalai gets its name from the rock or hill lock located at the heart of the locality. Muslim Sufi Saint Khwaja Syed Ahmed Shah Aulia is interred here. This Hillock was called Fakirs Tope during the British Raj

The Bharathidasan University's Centre of Distance Education is located here. The Anna Stadium complex. are also located here.

See also 
 Tiruchirappalli Fort

Notes 

Neighbourhoods and suburbs of Tiruchirappalli
Tourist attractions in Tiruchirappalli